Alexis Iparraguirre (Lima, 8 April 1974) is a Peruvian short story writer.

Biography
Iparraguirre holds a Ph.D. degree in Latin American, Iberian, and Latino Cultures from the Graduate Center, CUNY, and a MFA degree in Creative Writing in Spanish from New York University (NYU). He studied Linguistics and Literature at Pontifical Catholic University of Peru (PUCP).

Books 
 His book of short stories, El Inventario de las Naves (Inventory of Ships), won the prestigious PUCP National Prize for Narrative in 2005.
 In 2016, he published El fuego de las multitudes (The Fire of Crowds), his second collection of short stories.
 In 2021, he co-edited (with Francisco Joaquín Marro) Esta realidad no existe (This reality does not exist), a collection of 14 science-fiction short stories by Peruvian writers.

Work published in anthologies 
 Selección peruana 1990-2005 (compilation by Álvaro Lasso), Lima, Estruendomudo Editores, 2005.
 Selección peruana 1990-2007 (compilation by Álvaro Lasso), Lima, Estruendomudo Editores, 2007.
 Disidentes. Muestra de la nueva narrativa peruana (selection and introduction by Gabriel Ruiz Ortega), Lima, Revuelta Editores, 2007.
 Nuevos lances, otros fuegos (compilation by Miguel Ildefonso), Lima, San Marcos, 2007.
 Disidentes 2. Muestra de la nueva narrativa peruana (selection and introduction by Gabriel Ruiz Ortega),Lima, Altazor Editores, 2012.
17 fantásticos cuentos peruanos. Antología, vol. 2 (selection and introduction by Gabriel Rimachi Sialer and Carlos Sotomayor), Lima, Editorial Casatomada, 2012.
 El cuento peruano 2001-2010 (selection and introduction by Ricardo González Vigil), Lima: Copé, 2013. 
 Denominación de origen Perú. Antología de cuento (selection and introduction by Miguel Ángel Manrique), Bogotá, Taller de Edición Rocca, 2014.
El fin de algo. Antología del nuevo cuento peruano 2001-2015 (selection and introduction by Víctor Ruíz Velazco), Lima, Santuario Editorial, 2015. 
King : tributo al Rey del Terror (compilation by Jorge Luis Cáceres), Buenos Aires: Interzona Editora y La Biblioteca de Babel, 2015.
 Estados Hispanos de América. Narrativa latinoamericana made in USA (selection and introduction by Antonio Díaz Oliva), New York: Sudaquia, 2016.
Pasajes de lo fantástico. Antología de relatos de expresión fantástica en el Perú (selection and introduction by Audrey Louyer), Lima, Maquinaciones, 2017.
 King. Tributo al rey del terror (compilation by Jorge Luis Cáceres), Lima, Editorial Casatomada, 2018.
 Universos en expansión. Antología crítica de la ciencia ficción peruana: siglo XIX-XXI (selection and introduction by José Güich), Lima, Universidad de Lima, 2018.
 Cuentos de ida y vuelta. 17 narradores peruanos en Estados Unidos (selection and introduction by Luis Hernán Castañeda and Carlos Villacorta), Lima, PEISA, 2019.
 Noticias del futuro. Antología del cuento de ciencia ficción peruano del siglo XXI (selection and introduction by Elton Honores), Lima, Altazor, 2019.
Incurables. Relatos de dolencias y males (selection and introduction by Oswaldo Estrada), Chicago: Ars Communitas, 2020.
Cuentos peruanos de la pandemia (selection and introduction by Ricardo González Vigil), Lima: Mascapaycha, 2021.
Vislumbra: muestra de cuentos peruanos de fantasía (selection and introduction by Carlos Enrique Saldivar), Lima: Torre de papel, 2021.
Fin: Antología de relatos escatológicos iberoamericanos (selection and introduction by Cristina Mondragón), Valladolid: Universidad de Valladolid, 2022.
Paciencia perdida. An Anthology of Peruvian Fiction (selection, translation, and introduction by Gabriel T. Saxton-Ruiz), Dallas: Dulzorada, 2022.

References 

1974 births
Peruvian male writers
Peruvian male short story writers
Peruvian speculative fiction writers
Living people
Writers from Lima
Pontifical Catholic University of Peru alumni
New York University alumni

External links
 No es fábula, an Alexis Iparraguirre's short story (in Spanish)
 Cuentos de todas las sangres (1992-2017) by Ricardo González Vigil, a guide to Contemporary Peruvian Short Stories (in Spanish)